Madeline in America and Other Holiday Tales is an illustrated collection of short stories by Ludwig Bemelmans, with only one of the stories featuring his popular children's character Madeline. This collection was first published in 1999 by Arthur A. Levine Books, and features stories previously published in other publications, with artwork by Ludwig Bemelmans' grandson, John Bemelmans-Marciano.

Plot
In the main tale, Madeline's great-grandfather dies, and he ends up leaving her a sizable inheritance. Madeline and her schoolmates, under the supervision of their teacher, Miss Clavel, go to America and have a wonderful vacation. It turns out that, much to Madeline's disappointment, she can't claim the inheritance her great-grandfather left for her until she turns 21. While Madeline, her classmates and their teacher ultimately return to Paris, Madeline vows to eventually return to America.

External links
Madeline in America and Other Holiday Tales

1999 short story collections
1999 children's books
American picture books
American short story collections
Children's short story collections
Arthur A. Levine Books books